Bucklow-St. Martins is an electoral ward of Trafford covering the town of Partington, the village of Carrington and a small part of Sale.

The ward was created in 2004 from parts of the former Bucklow and St. Martin's wards.

Councillors 
The councillors are Adele New (Labour), Aidan Williams (Labour), and James Wright (Labour).

 indicates seat up for re-election.
 indicates councillor defection.
 indicates a by-election.

Elections in the 2020s

May 2022

May 2021

Elections in the 2010s

May 2019

May 2018

September 2017 (by-election)

May 2016

May 2015 

NOTE: John Smith defected to the Conservative Party in May 2016.

May 2014

May 2012

May 2011

May 2010

Elections in the 2000s

May 2008

May 2007

May 2006

May 2004

References

External links
Trafford Council

Wards of Trafford
2004 establishments in England